Bertram Genard Cooper (born August 24, 1952) was a National Football League linebacker who played in 1976 for the Tampa Bay Buccaneers. He attended college at Florida State University and was the New York Jets 12th round pick in the 1975 NFL Draft.

References

Living people
1952 births
Tampa Bay Buccaneers players
American football linebackers
Florida State Seminoles football players
Players of American football from Tallahassee, Florida